Hibiscus and Bays is a local government area in Auckland, in New Zealand's Auckland Region, governed by the Hibiscus and Bays Local Board and Auckland Council. It currently aligns with the council's Albany Ward.

Geography

The area includes the suburbs of Waiwera, Orewa, Red Beach, Stanmore Bay, Manly, Army Bay, Gulf Harbour, Arkles Bay, Silverdale, Stillwater, Long Bay, Torbay, Waiake, Browns Bay, Rothesay Bay, Murrays Bay, Mairangi Bay and Campbells Bay.

The boundary of Hibiscus and Bays stretches from Waiwera in the north to Campbells Bay in the south, and across the Whangaparaoa Peninsula out to Tiritiri Matangi Island in the east. The main town centres are at Orewa, Silverdale, Whangaparaoa, Browns Bay and Mairangi Bay.

Features

The area has many beaches and parks, including Orewa Beach.

The Shakespear Regional Park, Long Bay Regional Park, Long Bay-Okura Marine Reserve and Tiritiri Matangi Island are protected areas that provide habitats for a range of plants and animals.

Gulf Harbour Marina is located on the Whangaparaoa Peninsula.

References